Gitarra is a genus of trilobite in the family Proetidae that lived between the late Tournaisian and Late Westphalian of the Lower-Middle Devonian.

History and classification
The genus was described by Josef Gandl in 1968, who assigned it to the family Phillipsiidae.  This placement was challenged by Halszka Osmólska in 1970, who noted the similarity of Gitarra to the, then Proetidae, genera Griffithidella and Weania.

Distribution 
Gitarra has been found in the Carboniferous of Germany, and Spain.

References 

Proetida genera
Proetidae